Patrick Bassey (20 November 1957 – 12 November 2020) was a Nigerian weightlifter. He competed in the men's lightweight event at the 1984 Summer Olympics.

References

External links
 

1957 births
2020 deaths
Nigerian male weightlifters
Olympic weightlifters of Nigeria
Weightlifters at the 1984 Summer Olympics
Place of birth missing
Commonwealth Games medallists in weightlifting
Commonwealth Games bronze medallists for Nigeria
Weightlifters at the 1982 Commonwealth Games
Medallists at the 1982 Commonwealth Games